Dan Evans was the defending champion but chose not to defend his title.

Lu Yen-hsun won the title after defeating Tatsuma Ito 6–1, 7–6(7–4) in the final.

Seeds

Draw

Finals

Top half

Bottom half

References

External links
Main draw
Qualifying draw

Santaizi ATP Challenger - Singles
2017 Singles
2017 in Taiwanese tennis